Maevia is a spider genus of the family Salticidae (jumping spiders).

Maevia appears to have been a large blanket genus in its beginnings, with not closely related species from the New World and the region from India to the Moluccas being lumped there. As the type species is from North America, those that occur in the New World were left in the genus, with most others transferred to other genera. However, several species exist in Asia for which there has been no information since their description, often more than a hundred years ago, so transferring them to other genera proves difficult.

Species
 Maevia albozonata Hasselt, 1882 – Sumatra
 Maevia expansa Barnes, 1955 – United States
 Maevia gracilipes Taczanowski, 1878 – Peru
 Maevia inclemens (Walckenaer, 1837) – USA, Canada
 Maevia intermedia Barnes, 1955 – USA
 Maevia quadrilineata Hasselt, 1882 – Sumatra
 Maevia susiformis Taczanowski, 1878 – Peru
 Maevia trilineata Taczanowski, 1878 – Peru

Footnotes

References
  (1955): North American jumping spiders of the genus Maevia. American Museum Novitates 1746. PDF
  (1958): North American jumping spiders of the subfamily Marpissinae (Araneae, Salticidae). American Museum Novitates 1867. PDF Abstract (Marpissa, Metacyrba, Menemerus, Maevia)
  (2000): An Introduction to the Spiders of South East Asia. Malaysian Nature Society, Kuala Lumpur.
  (2008): The world spider catalog, version 8.5. American Museum of Natural History.

External links
 Picture of M. expansa
 Picture of M. inclemens
 Picture of M. michelsoni — another one
 Picture of Maevia species (free for noncommercial use)

Salticidae
Salticidae genera
Spiders of North America
Spiders of South America
Spiders of Asia